Manulea affineola is a moth of the family Erebidae. It is found in the Russian Far East (Primorye), Korea, China (Shaanxi) and Japan.

References

Moths described in 1864
Lithosiina
Moths of Japan